Dosso is a department of the Dosso Region in Niger. Its capital lies at the city of Dosso. As of 2011, the department had a total population of 488,509 people.

References

Departments of Niger
Dosso Region